Auburnton is an unincorporated community and ghost town, within the Rural Municipality of Moose Creek No. 33, Saskatchewan, Canada, approximately 89.3 km east of the city of Estevan. Farming and oil are major local industries. The community is located at the junction of Highway 361 and Highway 603.

See also
List of communities in Saskatchewan
List of ghost towns in Saskatchewan

References

External links

Reciprocity No. 32, Saskatchewan
Unincorporated communities in Saskatchewan
Division No. 1, Saskatchewan